Ligdia is a genus of moths in the family Geometridae erected by Achille Guenée in 1857.

Species
Ligdia adustata (Denis & Schiffermüller, 1775)
Ligdia coctata Guenée, [1858]
Ligdia extratenebrosa (Wehrli, 1936)
Ligdia wagneri Ferguson & Adams, 2008

References

Abraxini